The genus Sorex includes many of the common shrews of Eurasia and North America, and contains at least 142 known species and subspecies. Members of this genus, known as long-tailed shrews, are the only members of the tribe Soricini of the subfamily Soricinae (red-toothed shrews). They have 32 teeth.

These animals have long, pointed snouts, small ears, which are often not visible, and scent glands located on the sides of their bodies. As their eyesight is generally poor, they rely on hearing and smell to locate their prey, mainly insects. Some species also use echolocation. Distinguishing between species without examining the dental pattern is often difficult.

In some species, a female shrew and her dependent young form "caravans", in which each shrew grasps the rear of the shrew in front, when changing location.

Species
 Genus Sorex – most basal of the genera
 Kashmir pygmy shrew (S. planiceps) – India and Pakistan
 Tibetan shrew (S. thibetanus) – endemic to China
 Subgenus Otisorex – mostly North American shrews with a few species found on the Kamchatka Peninsula and islands in the Bering Sea.
 Chiapan shrew (S. chiapensis)
Cruz's long-tailed shrew (S. cruzi)
Long-tailed shrew (S. dispar) 
Sorex dispar blitchi
Sorex dispar dispar
Western pygmy shrew (S. eximius)
Sorex eximius eximius
Sorex eximius montanus
 Smoky shrew (S. fumeus)
Sorex fumeus fumeus
Sorex fumeus umbrosus
 Eastern pygmy shrew (S. hoyi) 
Sorex hoyi alnorum
Sorex hoyi hoyi
Sorex hoyi thompsoni
Sorex hoyi winnemana
 Ibarra shrew (S. ibarrai)
Large-toothed shrew (S. macrodon)
 Sierra shrew (S. madrensis) 
McCarthy's shrew (S. mccarthyi) 
Carmen Mountain shrew (S. milleri) 
 Mutable shrew (S. mutabilis) 
Dwarf shrew (S. nanus) 
 Mexican long-tailed shrew (S. oreopolus) 
 Orizaba long-tailed shrew (S. orizabae)
 Ornate shrew (S. ornatus)
Sorex ornatus juncensis
S. o. lagunae
S. o. ornatus
S. o. relictus
S. o. salarius
S. o. salicornicus
S. o. sinuosus
S. o. willetti
 Inyo shrew (S. tenellus) 
 Verapaz shrew (S. veraepacis)
Ixtlan shrew (Sorex ixtlanensis)
 S. vagrans complex
 Glacier Bay water shrew (S. alaskanus)
 Eastern water shrew (S. albibarbis)
S. a. gloveralleni
S. a. labradorensis
S. a. punctulatus
S. a. turneri
Baird's shrew (S. bairdi) 
S. b. bairdi
S. b. permiliensis
 Marsh shrew (S. bendirii)
S. b. albiventer
S. b. bendirii
S. b. palmeri
 Montane shrew (S. monticola)
S. m. calvertensis
S. m. insularis
S. m. isolatus
S. m. longicaudus
S. m. malitiosus
S. m. parvidens
S. m. prevostensis
S. m. setosus
 New Mexico shrew (S. neomexicanus)
 Northern montane shrew (S. obscurus)
S. m. alascensis
S. m. elassodon
S. m. obscurus
S. m. shumaginensis
S. m. soperi
Pacific shrew (S. pacificus)
S. p. pacificus
S. p. cascadensis 
 Western water shrew (S. navigator)
S. n. brooksi
S. n. navigator
American water shrew (S. palustris)
S. p. hydrobadistes
S. p. palustris
 Fog shrew (S. sonomae) 
S. s. sonomae
S. s. tenelliodus
 Vagrant shrew (S. vagrans)
S. v. halicoetes
S. v. paludivagus
S. v. vagrans
 S. cinereus group
 Kamchatka shrew (S. camtschaticus) 
 Cinereous shrew (S. cinereus) 
S. c. acadicus
S. c. cinereus
S. c. hollisteri
S. c. lesueurii
S. c. miscix
S. c. ohioensis
S. c. streatori
 Maryland shrew (S. fontinalis) 
Prairie shrew (S. haydeni) 
 Saint Lawrence Island shrew (S. jacksoni) 
 Paramushir shrew (S. leucogaster) 
 Southeastern shrew (S. longirostris) 
 Mount Lyell shrew (S. lyelli)
 Portenko's shrew (S. portenkoi) 
 Preble's shrew (S. preblei) 
 Pribilof Island shrew (S. pribilofensis)
 Olympic shrew (S. rohweri)
 Barren ground shrew  (S. ugyunak) 
 Subgenus Sorex
 Dneper common shrew (S. averini) 
 Lesser striped shrew (S. bedfordiae) 
 Greater stripe-backed shrew (S. cylindricauda) 
 Chinese highland shrew (S. excelsus) 
 Azumi shrew (S. hosonoi) 
 Chinese shrew (S. sinalis) 
 Alaska tiny shrew (S. yukonicus)
 S. alpinus group
 Alpine shrew (S. alpinus) 
 Ussuri shrew (S. mirabilis) 
 S. araneus group
 Valais shrew (S. antinorii)
 Common shrew (S. araneus) 
 Udine shrew (S. arunchi) 
 Crowned shrew (S. coronatus) 
 Siberian large-toothed shrew  (S. daphaenodon) 
S. d. daphaenodon
S. d. sanguinidens
S. d. scaloni
 Iberian shrew (S. granarius) 
 Caucasian shrew (S. satunini) 
 S. arcticus group
 Arctic shrew (S. arcticus)
S. a. arcticus
S. a. laricorum
 Maritime shrew (S. maritimensis)
 S. tundrensis
 Tien Shan shrew (S. asper)
 Gansu shrew (S. cansulus) 
 Tundra shrew (S. tundrensis) 
 S. minutus group
 Buchara shrew (S. buchariensis) 
 Kozlov's shrew (S. kozlovi) 
 Caucasian pygmy shrew (S. volnuchini)
S. v. dahli
S. v. volnuchini
 S. caecutiens group
 Laxmann's shrew (S. caecutiens) 
 Taiga shrew (S. isodon) 
 Eurasian least shrew (S. minutissimus) 
 Eurasian pygmy shrew (S. minutus) 
 Flat-skulled shrew (S. roboratus) 
 Shinto shrew (S. shinto) 
S. s. sadonis
S. s. shikokensis
S. s. shinto
 Long-clawed shrew (S. unguiculatus) 
 S. gracillimus group
 Slender shrew (S. gracillimus) 
 S. raddei
 Radde's shrew (S. raddei) 
 S. samniticus
 Apennine shrew (S. samniticus)
 Subgenus incertae sedis
 Alto shrew (S. altoensis) – Mexico
Arizona shrew (S. arizonae) – United States (Arizona, New Mexico) Mexico (Chihuahua)
 Zacatecas shrew (S. emarginatus) – Mexico
 Jalisco shrew (S. mediopua) – Mexico 
Merriam's shrew (S. merriami) – Western United States (Washington, Oregon, California, Idaho, Nevada, Utah, Arizona, New Mexico, Wyoming, Colorado) 
 Saussure's shrew (S. saussurei) – Mexico and Guatemala
S. s. godmani
S. s. saussurei
 Salvin's shrew (S. salvini) – Mexico and Guatemala
Sclater's shrew (S. sclateri) – Mexico
 San Cristobal shrew (S. stizodon) – Mexico 
 Trowbridge's shrew (S. trowbridgii) – Pacific Coast United States (Washington, Oregon, California) Canada (southern British Columbia)
S. t. destructioni
S. t. humboldtensis
S. t. mariposae
S. t. montereyensis
S. t. trowbridgii
 Chestnut-bellied shrew (S. ventralis) – Mexico
 Veracruz shrew (S. veraecrucis) – Mexico
S. v. oaxacae
S. v. veraecrucis

References

 
Mammal genera
Red-toothed shrews
Animals that use echolocation
Mammals described in 1758
Taxa named by Carl Linnaeus